William Imon Norwood Jr. also Bill Norwood (April 21, 1941 – December 13, 2020) was an American pediatric cardiac surgeon and physician. He was known for the Norwood procedure, a pioneering cardiac operation  named after him for children born with Hypoplastic left heart syndrome.

Early life and education

William Norwood was born in Camden, Arkansas, to William and Pearl Norwood. First, he studied chemistry and biology at the University of New Mexico and then medicine at the University of Colorado School of Medicine. His postgraduate training in cardiothoracic surgery was at Peter Bent Brigham Hospital Harvard and a pediatric cardiothoracic fellowship at Boston Children's Medical Center, Harvard University. Later, he was appointed chief of cardiothoracic surgery at The Children's Hospital of Philadelphia, University of Pennsylvania.

Career
Norwood co-founded and was vice president, president and then CEO of the Aldo Castañeda Institute in Genolier, Switzerland. Nemours Cardiac Center in Wilmington, Delaware was the institution from which he retired after a long and successful career as a heart surgeon.

Norwood was also the developer of pioneering heart surgery in infants and newborns for congenital heart defects. The Norwood Procedure is the first of three operations performed to correct the congenital cardiac lesion known as hypoplastic left heart syndrome (HLHS). The procedure is typically done within a few days of life of newborns.

Project HOPE, was extending its charitable help also to countries in Eastern Europe and Bill Norwood started his visits to Poland. In late 1970s he came with other American staff to the Polish-American Institute of Pediatrics in Cracow, Poland. His work and initiative was instrumental in organizing and developing pediatric cardiac surgery in this region of Poland.

Death
Norwood died in Albuquerque on December 13, 2020, at age 79

See also 
 Francis Fontan
 William Glenn

References 

1941 births
2020 deaths
American cardiac surgeons
People from Camden, Arkansas
Physicians from Arkansas
University of Colorado School of Medicine alumni
University of New Mexico alumni